Delicate is the eighth studio album from Canadian new wave band, Martha & The Muffins.  It was produced by Mark Gane, Leo Valvassori and Martha Johnson, and mixed by David Bottrill. The first single from the album was "Mess". The album was the band's first full-length release of new material in 18 years.

Track listing

Personnel
Martha Johnson - vocals, keyboards, percussion, additional guitar, melodica
Mark Gane - vocals, guitars, mandolin, bass, lap steel, percussion, keyboards, treatments
Leo Valvassori - bass, synth and bowed basses, keyboards, additional guitar, percussion, cello, loudhailer

with:

Eric Paul - drums, backing vocals
Paul Brennan - drums
Steve Donald - trombone
Gerry Reid - flutes, messing around vocals
Elly Barlin-Daniels - backing vocals
David Blyth - backing vocals
Debby Blyth - backing vocals
Eve Gane - backing vocals
Andrea Ramolo - backing vocals
Catherine Robertson - backing vocals
Charlie Roby - backing vocals
Rachel Winer - backing vocals

2010 albums
Martha and the Muffins albums
Albums produced by David Bottrill